Shree Baba Harballabh Sangeet Sammelan is a festival of Indian classical music, held every year on the last weekend in December, in Jalandhar City. 

The festival, which was first held in 1875 at the Sidh Peeth Shri Devi Talab Mandir, in Jalandhar, is named after Baba Harballabh who is considered a saint and an exponent of Hindustani classical music in northern India. 

The 3 day long festival hosts 15–20 artists every year. Prominent artists of Hindustani Classical Music from India and Pakistan have performed at the festival at one time or the other during the history of the festival, which attracts thousands of music lovers from all over India and other countries.

There is no admission fee.  The money for organizing the festival comes from various donations and grants, both public and private.

Shree Baba Harballabh Sangeet Pratiyogita
To encourage the young to appreciate and improve themselves in the field of Hindustani classical music and to bring out the best amongst the competitors, an open competition in Hindustani Classical Music is organized by the Mahasabha every year for 3 days prior to the annual Sangeet Sammelan. 

There are three categories for competition, namely: Vocal, Instrumental (Non-Percussion) and Instrumental (Percussion) with two age groups in each category: Juniors (Yuva Varg - between 13 and 19 years) and Seniors (Varishth Varg - 19 to 25 years) and three prizes in each category: First, Second and Third. 

The winners from the Senior age group are initiated and given an opportunity to perform as 'Performing Artists' during the next Sammelan.

Shree Baba Harballabh Sangeet Utsavs
Vasant Utsav, Malhar Utsav and Hemant Utsav are organized in the months of February, August and October every year. 
Two to three artists are invited during these Utsavs to give their performance during a 4-5 hour program on the scheduled evenings. 

During the Utsavs, preference is given to the upcoming artists in the field of Hindustani classical music so as to give them appropriate exposure in music circles.

External links 
 Official website of Harballabh Sangeet Sammelan
 Harballabh Blog

Music festivals in India
Recurring events established in 1875
Jalandhar
Hindustani classical music festivals
Music festivals established in 1875